Ahmed Fathi (24 August 1949 – 7 June 2014) was an Iraqi football forward who played for Iraq in the 1972 AFC Asian Cup.

He played for the national team between 1972 and 1973.

References

1949 births
2014 deaths
Iraqi footballers
Iraq international footballers
Association football forwards
1972 AFC Asian Cup players